Takiya may refer to:

Taqiyya, a concept within the Shia Islam theological framework
Takiya, Iran, a village in Khuzestan Province, Iran
Bazmaghbyur, Armenia
Taqiyah (cap)